Muscat Bay is a resort in Oman, located at Bandar Jissah near Qantab. Previously named Saraya Bandar Jissah, the project was rebranded as Muscat Bay in 2017. The resort is support by the Omani government as part of an effort to expand the tourism industry in the country.

History 
Saraya Bandar Jissah was established in 2007, under private ownership. The project was rebranded to Muscat Bay in 2017.

Projects

Properties 
Muscat Bay spans across an area of 2.2 million square meters, with a high point of 250 metres. It consists of a mix of residential units including villas and apartments. Two 5-star Jumeirah Hotels are under development at Muscat Bay: Jumeirah Muscat Bay and a boutique luxury hotel.

References 

Tourist attractions in Oman
Hotels in Oman